Mfanzile Dlamini (born 18 February 1983) is a Liswati former footballer who played as a striker.

References

External links

1983 births
Living people
Swazi footballers
Eswatini international footballers
Mhlambanyatsi Rovers F.C. players
Royal Leopards F.C. players
Association football forwards
Swazi expatriate footballers
Swazi expatriate sportspeople in South Africa
Expatriate soccer players in South Africa
People from Manzini Region